Clinton County is a county located in the U.S. state of Indiana.  As of 2010, the population was 33,224. The county seat is Frankfort.

History
Clinton County officially came into existence on March 1, 1830, and was named in honor of DeWitt Clinton, the sixth Governor of New York State and architect of the Erie Canal, which opened up the Upper Midwest to settlement.  The act forming the county was approved by the Indiana General Assembly on January 29, 1830, and created Clinton from the eastern parts of neighboring Tippecanoe County.

Lieutenant General James F. Record was born and raised in Clinton County; Gen Record was awarded 3x Distinguished Service Crosses for his gallantry during the Vietnam War.

Geography
There is E85 in Clinton County.

Adjacent counties
 Carroll County  (north)
 Howard County  (northeast)
 Tipton County  (east)
 Hamilton County  (southeast)
 Boone County  (south)
 Montgomery County (southwest)
 Tippecanoe County (west)

Cities and towns

Unincorporated towns

Extinct towns
 Berlin
 Martinsville
 Prairieville

Townships

Major highways
  Interstate 65
  U.S. Route 52
  U.S. Route 421
  Indiana State Road 26
  Indiana State Road 28
  Indiana State Road 29
  Indiana State Road 38
  Indiana State Road 39
  Indiana State Road 75

Airport
Clinton County is served by the Frankfort Municipal Airport.

Railroads
 CSX Transportation
 Norfolk Southern Railway

Climate and weather 

Government

The county government is a constitutional body, and is granted specific powers by the Constitution of Indiana, and by the Indiana Code.

County Council: The county council is the legislative branch of the county government and controls all the spending and revenue collection in the county. Representatives are elected from county districts. The council members serve four-year terms. They are responsible for setting salaries, the annual budget, and special spending. The council also has limited authority to impose local taxes, in the form of an income and property tax that is subject to state level approval, excise taxes, and service taxes.

Board of Commissioners: The executive body of the county is made of a board of commissioners. The commissioners are elected county-wide, in staggered terms, and each serves a four-year term. One of the commissioners, typically the most senior, serves as president. The commissioners are charged with executing the acts legislated by the council, collecting revenue, and managing the day-to-day functions of the county government.

Court: The county maintains a small claims court that can handle some civil cases. The judge on the court is elected to a term of four years and must be a member of the Indiana Bar Association. The judge is assisted by a constable who is also elected to a four-year term. In some cases, court decisions can be appealed to the state-level circuit court.

County Officials: The county has several other elected offices, including sheriff, coroner, auditor, treasurer, recorder, surveyor, and circuit court clerk. Each of these elected officers serves a term of four years and oversees a different part of county government. Members elected to county government positions are required to declare a party affiliation and to be residents of the county.

Clinton County is part of Indiana's 4th congressional district; Indiana Senate districts 7 and 23; and Indiana House of Representatives district 38.

Demographics

As of the 2010 United States Census, there were 33,224 people, 12,105 households, and 8,754 families residing in the county. The racial makeup of the county was 91.0% white, 0.4% black or African American, 0.2% Asian, 0.2% American Indian, 6.8% from other races, and 1.3% from two or more races. Those of Hispanic or Latino origin made up 13.2% of the population. In terms of ancestry, 22.4% were German, 11.1% were American, 10.3% were Irish, and 9.6% were English.

Of the 12,105 households, 36.1% had children under the age of 18 living with them, 55.5% were married couples living together, 11.1% had a female householder with no husband present, 27.7% were non-families, and 23.1% of all households were made up of individuals. The average household size was 2.68 and the average family size was 3.13. The median age was 37.5 years.

The median income for a household in the county was $47,697 and the median income for a family was $57,445. Males had a median income of $42,009 versus $29,086 for females. The per capita income for the county was $21,131. About 7.5% of families and 11.7% of the population were below the poverty line, including 17.0% of those under age 18 and 6.4% of those age 65 or over.

2020 census

See also
 National Register of Historic Places listings in Clinton County, Indiana

Further reading
 History of Clinton County, Indiana: Together with Sketches of Its Cities, Villages and Towns, Educational, Religious, Civil, Military, and Political ... Citizens. Charleston: Nabu Press (2010).

References

External links
 Clinton County Chamber of Commerce
 Clinton County History and Genealogy from US GenWeb
 Clinton County Economic Development

 
Indiana counties
1830 establishments in Indiana
Populated places established in 1830